Lisa Campos is the current director of athletics for the University of Texas at San Antonio. She previously served as athletic director for Northern Arizona University from 2012 to 2017, and as an associate athletic director at the University of Texas at El Paso from 2003 to 2012. Campos graduated from Colorado State University with both bachelor's and master's degrees. She graduated from the University of Texas at El Paso with a doctorate degree. Campos was named athletic director at the University of Texas at San Antonio on November 16, 2017. Campos also represents Conference USA on the NCAA Division I Council.

References

External links
 
 UTSA profile

Year of birth missing (living people)
1970s births
Living people
Northern Arizona Lumberjacks athletic directors
UTSA Roadrunners athletic directors
Colorado State University alumni
University of Texas at El Paso alumni
Women college athletic directors in the United States